Season five of the television program American Experience originally aired on the PBS network in the United States on September 20, 1992 and concluded on March 1, 1993. This is the fifth season to feature David McCullough as the host. The season contained 12 new episodes and began with the first part of The Kennedys film, "The Father, 1900–1961".

Episodes

Notes

References

1992 American television seasons
1993 American television seasons
American Experience